Higinio Ortúzar Santamaría (10 January 1915 – 8 November 1982) was a Chilean footballer who made his entire career in Spain.

Career
The first Chilean in the Spanish football, he made his debut for Erandio Club in 1935, and next he played for Barakaldo CF, Athletic Bilbao, Valencia CF, Real Valladolid and Real Sociedad. He was loaned to Racing de Santander in 1936 for 4,500 pesetas, but he couldn't play due to the Spanish coup of July.

While at Athletic (one of few players born outside the Basque region to play for the club under their signing policy and the only from Chile in the history), he won a League and Cup double in 1943, and followed this up with further league titles playing for Valencia in 1944 and 1947. In his 30s he featured for Valladolid and Real Sociedad in successive seasons, helping each to gain promotion from the second tier.

After retiring as a player, he became a football coach, and managed sides including CD Logroñés.

Personal life
Born in Santiago, Chile, his parents were Basques. He returned to Euzkadi at early age, after his mother died.

He made his home in Areeta and managed a bar in Mayor Street.

References

External links
Higinio Ortúzar at Athletic-Club 

Higinio Ortúzar at Ciberche 
Higinio Ortúzar, un futbolista chileno de Areeta 

1915 births
1982 deaths
Footballers from Santiago
Chilean footballers
Chilean expatriate footballers
Chilean people of Spanish descent
Sportspeople of Spanish descent
Chilean people of Basque descent
Citizens of Spain through descent
SD Erandio Club players
Racing de Santander players
Barakaldo CF footballers
Athletic Bilbao footballers
Valencia CF players
Real Valladolid players
Real Sociedad footballers
La Liga players
Segunda División players
Association football midfielders
Association football defenders
Chilean football managers
Chilean expatriate football managers
CD Logroñés managers
Cádiz CF managers
Cultural Leonesa managers
Real Avilés CF managers
Burgos CF (1936) managers
UD Salamanca managers
Tercera División managers
Segunda División managers
Chilean expatriate sportspeople in Spain
Expatriate footballers in Spain
Expatriate football managers in Spain